Santhanuthalapadu (or Santanutalapadu) is a village in Prakasam district of the Indian state of Andhra Pradesh. It is located Santhanuthalapadu mandal in Ongole revenue division.

Assembly constituency
Santhanuthalapadu is an assembly constituency in Andhra Pradesh reserved for Scheduled Castes. There were 1,83,853 registered voters in the Santhanuthalapadu constituency in 1999 elections.

List of Elected Members:
1978 - Vema Yellaiah
1983 - Aareti Kotaiah
1985 - Kasukurthi Adenna, B.A.
1989 - Gurrala Venkata Seshu
1994 - Thavanam Chenchaiah
1999 - Palaparthi David Raju
2004 - Dara Sambaiah
2009 - Daanam Vijay kumar
There is still no proper water supply in village. There is enough water in the river. Because of politicians people are not getting water. Everyone is deepening the bore wells,  getting salt water. Government is not helping. People complained to the Ongole collector office so many times. Still no use.

References 

Villages in Prakasam district